Sir John Mallorie (1610 – 23 January 1655) was an English politician who sat in the House of Commons  from 1640 to 1642. He fought on the Royalist side in the English Civil War.

Mallory was the son of William Mallory and his wife Dorothy Bellingham, daughter of Sir James Bellingham of Levens, in Westmorland. John resided at Studley Royal, home to the family since 1452, which was added to their Hutton Conyers estate.

In November 1640, Mallory was elected together with his father as Member of Parliament for Ripon in the Long Parliament. He was knighted by King Charles I in December 1641 and was disabled from sitting in Parliament on 16 January 1642. By August 1642 Mallory had command of a regiment of infantry in the King's army. He was governor of Skipton Castle. He later compounded for the delinquency of himself and his father.

Mallory died aged 45, possibly of a contagious disease, as he was buried the next day in Ripon Cathedral in the family chapel.

Mallory married Mary Moseley, daughter of John Moseley Lord Mayor of York.

References

1610 births
1655 deaths
English MPs 1640–1648
Cavaliers
People from Ripon
Infectious disease deaths in England
People from the Borough of Harrogate